Spearfish may refer to:

Places 
Spearfish, South Dakota, United States
North Spearfish, South Dakota, United States
Spearfish Formation, a geologic formation in the United States

Biology 
 Tetrapturus, a genus of marlin containing spearfish, fish with elongated bodies and a spear-like snouts or bills
Longbill spearfish, a species of marlin native to the Atlantic Ocean
Mediterranean spearfish, a species of marlin native to the Mediterranean Sea
Shortbill spearfish, a species of marlin native to the Indian and Pacific Oceans
Roundscale spearfish, a species of marlin native to the eastern Atlantic Ocean to the western Mediterranean Sea
Spearfish remora, a species of remora found around the world in tropical and subtropical seas
Spearfish Fisheries Center, one of 70 fish hatcheries as part of the National Fish Hatchery System of the U.S. Fish and Wildlife Service

Military 
Spearfish torpedo, or simply Spearfish, is a modern torpedo built by GEC-Marconi
Fairey Spearfish, a prototype dive bomber of the immediate post World War II period
HMS Spearfish (69S), a 1936 British S-class submarine lost in World War II
USS Spearfish (SS-190), a US submarine in World War II